The plantar cuneonavicular ligaments are fibrous bands that connect the plantar surface of the navicular bone to the adjacent plantar surfaces of the three cuneiform bones.

Ligaments of the lower limb